Cambodia competed at the 2016 Summer Olympics in Rio de Janeiro, Brazil, from 5 to 21 August 2016. The nation's participation marked its sixth consecutive appearance at the Summer Olympics, although it had previously appeared in three editions (1956, 1964, and 1972) under the name Kampuchea.

National Olympic Committee of Cambodia sent a total of six athletes, two men and four women, to the Games, competing only in athletics, swimming, taekwondo, and freestyle wrestling, the country's sporting debut in Rio de Janeiro. Five of them, including freestyle swimmer and three-time Olympian Hemthon Vitiny, received their spots to compete at the Games by wild card entries. Taekwondo fighter Sorn Seavmey, the only qualified sportswoman on merit, led the team as Cambodia's flag bearer in the opening ceremony. Cambodia, however, has yet to win its first Olympic medal.

Athletics
 
Cambodian athletes achieved qualifying standards in the following athletics events (up to a maximum of 3 athletes in each event):

Key
 Note – Ranks given for track events are within the athlete's heat only
 Q = Qualified for the next round
 q = Qualified for the next round as a fastest loser or, in field events, by position without achieving the qualifying target
 NR = National record
 N/A = Round not applicable for the event
 Bye = Athlete not required to compete in round

Track & road events

Swimming

Cambodia received a Universality invitation from FINA to send two swimmers (one male and one female) to the Olympics.

Taekwondo
 
Cambodia entered one athlete into the taekwondo competition at the Olympics. Sorn Seavmey secured a spot in the women's heavyweight category (+67 kg) by virtue of her victory at the 2016 Asian Qualification Tournament in Manila, Philippines.

Moreover, Seavmey became the first athlete ever from her country to qualify for the Olympics on merit (all other athletes that have competed for Cambodia, have done so through invitational quotas).

Wrestling
 
Cambodia received an invitation from the Tripartite Commission to send a wrestler competing in the women's freestyle 48 kg category, signifying the nation's Olympic return to the sport for the first time since 1996.

Key
 VT - Victory by Fall.
 PP - Decision by Points - the loser with technical points.
 PO - Decision by Points - the loser without technical points.
 ST – Technical superiority – the loser without technical points and a margin of victory of at least 8 (Greco-Roman) or 10 (freestyle) points.

Women's freestyle

References

External links 

 

Olympics
2016
Nations at the 2016 Summer Olympics